Lieutenant-General Sir Gonville Bromhead, 1st Baronet (20 September 1758 – 18 May 1822) was a British soldier who served in the Saratoga Campaign during the American Revolutionary War. Later he would fight against the Irish during the Irish Rebellion of 1789.

Early life 
Bromhead was born in Lincoln, England, on September 30, 1758. Gonville was named after his mother, Francis G. His father, Boardman Bromville was a major in the 62 Regiment of Foot. In 1770, at the age of 12, he would join the same regiment of Foot as a staff officer. He was educated at Winchester College and the  Military Academy in Little Chelsea under Lewis Lochée. He became an ensign at the age of 15, and a lieutenant at 17.

American Revolution 
At the age of 17 he would travel to America to join the British forces under Sir Guy Carleton to fight in the American Revolution. Gonville served in the Saratoga campaign. He fought at Trois Rivieres, and captured Mount Independence. During this battle he escaped the explosion of several mines, which the enemy had left on evacuating the place. Bromhead also fought at the Battle of Bemis Heights. During the battle, nearly the whole of his regiment was destroyed, himself and two privates being the only ones who were not killed or wounded. Bromhead would later be injured at Fort Hardy. At this time also, General John Burgoyne, the commander-in-chief, was captured by the enemy while trying to secure provisions for the British army. Gonville Bromhead volunteered to gather those provisions. He cut off the cables of the bateaux, which lead to a large quantity of provisions drifting down to the British army. George III thanked Gonville for these actions. During the war, he was captured by the Americans and held as a prisoner of war for upwards of three years.

Irish Rebellion of 1798 
He married Jane ffrench on 18 July 1787. When the Irish rebellion started, he assisted his brother-in-law, Lord ffrench, in organizing the Yeomanry Cavalry in which Bromhead served as a volunteer. Lord Carhampton, the commander-in-chief in Ireland, recommended Bromhead for a promotion. Resulting in a promotion to the lieutenant-colonelcy of the Lochaber Highlanders, who were stationed on the coast, due to the expectation of a French attack. This threatened invasion also resulted in Bromhead being appointed brigadier-general. Later he was appointed to major-general and than lieutenant-general.

Later life 
He was created 1st Baronet Bromhead, of Thurlby Hall on 19 February 1806 due to his service in the Irish Rebellion. The Bromheads had three sons, Sir Edward ffrench Bromhead, 2nd Baronet (born 26 March 1789), Sir Edmund Gonville Bromhead, 3rd Baronet (born 22 January 1791) and the Reverend Charles ffrench Bromhead. He died May 11, 1822.

References 

1758 births
1822 deaths
British Army lieutenant generals
British Army personnel of the American Revolutionary War
Baronets in the Baronetage of the United Kingdom
Military personnel from Lincolnshire